UFC Fight Night: Ladd vs. Dumont (also known as UFC Fight Night 195, UFC Vegas 40 and UFC on ESPN+ 53) was a mixed martial arts event produced by the Ultimate Fighting Championship that took place on October 16, 2021, at the UFC Apex facility in Enterprise, Nevada, part of the Las Vegas Metropolitan Area, United States.

Background
A women's bantamweight bout between Ketlen Vieira and former Strikeforce and UFC Women's Bantamweight Champion Miesha Tate was expected to headline the event. However, on September 22, the bout was pulled from the card after Tate tested positive for COVID-19. In turn, a women's featherweight bout between fellow former bantamweight champion Holly Holm and Norma Dumont was elevated to the main event. However on October 6, it was reported that Holm was forced to pull out of the event due to injury. She was replaced by Aspen Ladd.

A bantamweight bout between Timur Valiev and Daniel Santos was expected to take place at the event. However, in mid-September, Valiev withdrew due to injury and was replaced by Marcelo Rojo. In turn, Santos withdrew for unknown reasons and the bout was scrapped.

A women's flyweight bout between Manon Fiorot and Mayra Bueno Silva took place at this event. The bout was originally scheduled for UFC 266 but was postponed due to COVID-19 protocols.

A women's flyweight bout between Luana Carolina and Maryna Moroz was expected to take place at this event. However in late September, Moroz pulled out of the bout and was replaced by Sijara Eubanks. In turn, Eubanks was pulled from the event due to COVID-19 protocols and replaced by Lupita Godinez. Godinez made history as the first fighter to compete twice in the span of seven days, a record in modern UFC, non-tournament fights. The previous fastest turnaround was 10 days, when Khamzat Chimaev competed against John Phillips and Rhys McKee in July 2020.

A light heavyweight bout between Kennedy Nzechukwu and Da Un Jung was expected to take place at the event. However, the bout was postponed to UFC Fight Night: Holloway vs. Rodríguez for unknown reasons.

At the weigh-ins, Julian Marquez was pulled from his middleweight bout against Jordan Wright due to "non-COVID health issues." He never made it to the scale, even though his opponent weighed in within the middleweight non-title fight limit. As a result, the bout was cancelled.

Results

Bonus awards
The following fighters received $50,000 bonuses.
 Fight of the Night: No bonus awarded.
 Performance of the Night: Jim Miller, Nate Landwehr, Bruno Silva, and Danaa Batgerel

See also 

 List of UFC events
 List of current UFC fighters
 2021 in UFC

References 

UFC Fight Night
2021 in mixed martial arts
October 2021 sports events in the United States
2021 in sports in Nevada
Mixed martial arts in Las Vegas
Sports competitions in Las Vegas